Octocannoididae is a family of cnidarians belonging to the order Leptothecata.

Genera:
 Octocannoides Menon, 1932

References

Leptothecata
Cnidarian families